Lumbini Zone was one of the fourteen zones of Nepal, comprising six districts, namely, Arghakhanchi, Gulmi, Kapilvastu, Nawalparasi, Palpa and Rupandehi. Here is district wise List of Monuments which is in the Lumbini Zone.This is the place god Gautum Buddha was born. It is near to one district name Butwal and another side India

Lumbini Zone
 List of monuments in Arghakhanchi District 
 List of monuments in Gulmi District
 List of monuments in Kapilvastu District
 List of monuments in Nawalparasi District
 List of monuments in Palpa District
 List of monuments in Rupandehi District

References

Lumbini Zone
Lumbini Zone